Mangifera laurina is a species of flowering plant in the family Anacardiaceae. It commonly known as mangga kopyor, mangga pari in  Indonesian.

References

laurina
Flora of Malesia
Tropical fruit